Adam Mieczysław Stachowiak (born 18 December 1986) is a Polish professional footballer who plays as a goalkeeper for Lech Poznań II.

Career

Club
A product of the local youth setups of Olimpia Poznań and Unia Swarzędz, he made his professional debut on the other side of the country with the then second tier Jagiellonia Białystok. He then moved onto Odra Wodzisław, establishing himself as an Ekstraklasa player in his four years there.

He then had a short spell with Górnik Zabrze, who in August 2011, loaned him to Anorthosis Famagusta on a one-year deal.

Stachowiak signed a contract with the Bulgaria club Botev Plovdiv on 15 January 2013. He made his debut in A grupa on 1 March 2013 when his side beat Slavia Sofia 2–0. Stachowiak participated in all of Botev's games in Europa League during the 2013–14 and 2014–15 seasons. Stachowiak did not miss a single minute of the 2013–14 league campaign and subsequently was selected by fans as the player of the season.

Botev suffered a financial crisis at the start of the 2014–15 season. There were speculations that Stachowiak would leave the club, but he decided to remain at least until the next transfer window. He played in all four games in the Europa League and in the Bulgarian Supercup final, but remained on the bench at the beginning of the league campaign. He was again included in the starting lineup on 24 August 2014 during a 2–0 league win over Slavia Sofia. His steady performance in this game reestablished him as a first choice goalkeeper. On 27 September, he kept a clean sheet in the derby game with Lokomotiv Plovdiv, won by Botev 2–0.

At the beginning of 2015, Stachowiak demonstrated very good shape and kept a clean sheet in the first three A Grupa rounds of the year, in a 3–0 home win against Marek Dupnitsa, a 0–2 away win over Lokomotiv Plovdiv and a 2–0 home win over CSKA Sofia. On 15 March, Adam kept a clean sheet and contributed an assist for the second goal scored by Lachezar Baltanov during a 2–0 victory against CSKA Sofia. A week later, on 22 March, Stachowiak was among the key players for Botev during the 0–0 draw against Ludogorets Razgrad.

Adam did not play in two consecutive games and then returned to the starting lineup for the last game of the 2014–15 season, a 0–2 home defeat against Lokomotiv Sofia. Following the game, it was announced that the contracts of Stachowiak and his friend, the midfielder Tomáš Jirsák, would not be renewed and both of them would leave the club.

After leaving Denizlispor in 2020, after six months of free agency, he signed for another Turkish club Altay in January 2021.

On 10 March 2023, he joined his hometown club's reserves side, Lech Poznań II, on a deal until June 2024.

National team
He has earned five caps for the Poland U-21 team.

Honours
Botev Plovdiv
Bulgarian Cup runner-up: 2014
Bulgarian Supercup runner-up: 2014

References

External links
 

1986 births
Living people
Footballers from Poznań
Polish footballers
Poland under-21 international footballers
Association football goalkeepers
Jagiellonia Białystok players
Odra Wodzisław Śląski players
Górnik Zabrze players
Anorthosis Famagusta F.C. players
GKS Bełchatów players
Botev Plovdiv players
Gaziantep F.K. footballers
Denizlispor footballers
Altay S.K. footballers
Lech Poznań II players
Ekstraklasa players
I liga players
First Professional Football League (Bulgaria) players
Cypriot First Division players
Süper Lig players
TFF First League players
Polish expatriate footballers
Expatriate footballers in Bulgaria
Expatriate footballers in Cyprus
Expatriate footballers in Turkey
Polish expatriate sportspeople in Bulgaria
Polish expatriate sportspeople in Cyprus
Polish expatriate sportspeople in Turkey